Alireza Ghelichkhani (c. 1937 – 15 October 2018) was a Greco-Roman wrestler from Iran. He won a bronze medal at the 1961 World Championships.

References

Iranian male sport wrestlers
World Wrestling Championships medalists
1930s births
2018 deaths
20th-century Iranian people